Mehdi Isazadeh (born 1962) is an Iranian politician.

Beighi Sadr was born in Miandoab, West Azerbaijan.  He is a member of the 2008 and present Islamic Consultative Assembly from the electorate of Miandoab, Shahin Dezh and Takab With Rohollah Beighi. and member of Iran-Turkey Friendship society. Isazadeh won with 75,481 (33.73%) votes.

References

External links
  isazadeh Website

People from Miandoab
Deputies of Miandoab, Shahin Dezh and Takab
Imam Hossein University alumni
Living people
1962 births
Members of the 9th Islamic Consultative Assembly
Members of the 8th Islamic Consultative Assembly